Clarke Ingram is a United States radio personality and programming executive.

Ingram is best known in his home market (and hometown) of Pittsburgh, Pennsylvania.

Career 
Ingram was formerly the program director of two Pittsburgh stations, top 40 WBZZ (now KDKA-FM) and "Jammin' Oldies" WJJJ (now country WPGB). He also served as program director of top 40 stations WPXY in Rochester, New York and KRQQ in Tucson, Arizona, operations manager of top 40 KZZP in Phoenix, Arizona, and as an on-air personality at top 40 WHTZ (Z-100) in New York City and other radio stations including WBZZ, WWSW-FM, and the former WXKX/WHTX (now WKST-FM), all in Pittsburgh. He also was operations manager and program director at suburban WKHB/WKFB (owned by Broadcast Communications Inc.) for several years.

While the bulk of Ingram's career was in top 40 radio, he moved into oldies in his later years, and hosted weekend oldies shows on WWSW-FM and WKHB/WKFB. Saying it was "the first step on the road to my retirement", Ingram relinquished his remaining duties at Broadcast Communications Inc. in 2011.

In 2013, Ingram returned to radio as consultant to Pittsburgh-area station WZUM, for which he developed an urban oldies format. Three years later, the station was sold and changed to a jazz format. In 2019, Ingram announced that "whatever time (he had) left on this earth" would be largely devoted to television history and preservation.  With assistance from fellow historian and preservationist Sean Cogan, he launched a YouTube channel called "Free The Kinescopes", which features rarely seen TV shows, including many from Ingram's collection.

Awards and recognition 
 In 1995, Ingram was named one of the top 40 "Top 40 DJs of All Time" (ranked #38) by Decalcomania, a radio enthusiasts' club publishing a monthly newsletter.  The list was published in the New York Daily News on September 5, 1995.
 Ingram won radio industry "Program Director of the Year" awards three times, twice from the Gavin Seminar for Media Professionals, and once from the Bobby Poe Pop Music Survey.

Other activities 
 Ingram is recognized as an expert on the defunct DuMont Television Network, and maintained an extensive website devoted to the subject.
 Ingram was also a leading force in a grassroots protest to get the CBS Television Network to reconsider its cancellation of the program Jericho, which it announced in May 2007. Ingram was referred to as a "save-the-show campaign leader" by columnist Rob Owen of the Pittsburgh Post-Gazette. In response, the producers gave Ingram an onscreen tribute in the penultimate scene of the series' final episode in 2008.

References

External links
 Aircheck of Clarke Ingram on KZZP, Phoenix, August 1986, posted at airchexx.com
 Aircheck of Clarke Ingram on WKHB, Irwin, PA (serving the greater Pittsburgh market), posted at airchexx.com

American radio personalities
Living people
American radio executives
Year of birth missing (living people)